Valvettithurai massacre may refer to:

1984 Kokkilai massacres (army), carried out by the Sri Lanka Army in December 1984. 
1984 Kokkilai massacre (LTTE), carried out by the LTTE in December 1984.